The 1994–95 Algerian Championnat National was the 33rd season of the Algerian Championnat National since its establishment in 1962. A total of 16 teams contested the league, with US Chaouia as the defending champions, The Championnat started on November 11, 1994. and ended on June 22, 1995.

Team summaries

Promotion and relegation 
Teams promoted from Algerian Division 2 1994-1995 
 USM Alger
 USM Aïn Beïda
 ASM Oran

Teams relegated to Algerian Division 2 1995-1996
 GC Mascara
 NA Hussein Dey
 ASO Chlef

League table

Season statistics

Top scorers

8 goals : Mohamed Djalti (WAT), Farid Ghazi (USC).
7 goals : Idirem et Soufi (NAHD), Menad (JSK), Ardjaoui (ASO), Yessad (GCM). 
6 goals : Redha Zouani (USMB), Meftah (JSK), Meziane (MCO), Benhamena (GCM), Brahimi et Sahraoui (WAT), Kaoua (CSC), Khouni, Alloui et Benhemadi (ASAM). 
5 goals : Billal Zouani et Chambit (USMB), Guettal (WAB), Bensalah G. et Talis (ASO), Mehdaoui et Djillani (USC), Boulfelfel (CSC), Ali Moussa (CRB).

References

External links
1994–95 Algerian Championnat National

Algerian Championnat National
Championnat National
Algerian Ligue Professionnelle 1 seasons